The government of the Marshall Islands operates under a mixed parliamentary-presidential system as set forth in its Constitution. Elections are held every four years in universal suffrage (for all citizens above the age of 18), with each of the 24 constituencies (see below) electing one or more representatives (senators) to the lower house of RMI's unicameral legislature, the Nitijela. (Majuro, the capital atoll, elects five senators.) The President, who is head of state as well as head of government, is elected by the 33 senators of the Nitijela. Four of the five Marshallese presidents who have been elected since the Constitution was adopted in 1979 have been traditional paramount chiefs.

Governance occurs in a framework of a parliamentary representative democratic republic, and of an emerging  multi-party system, whereby the President of the Marshall Islands is both head of state and head of government. Executive power is exercised by the government. Legislative power is vested in both the government and the Nitijela (Legislature).
The Judiciary is independent of the executive and the legislature.

Executive branch

The president is elected by the Nitijela from among its members. Presidents pick cabinet members from the Nitijela. Amata Kabua was elected as the first president of the republic in 1979. Subsequently, he was re-elected to four-year terms in 1983, 1987, 1991, and 1996. After Amata Kabua's death in office, his first cousin, Imata Kabua, won a special election in 1997. The current president was elected and took office on January 14, 2020.

The executive branch consists of the President and the Presidential Cabinet, which consists of ten ministers appointed by the President with the approval of the Nitijela. President appoints, among the members of Nitijela, Minister in Assistance to the President of Marshall Islands who acts as a substitute for the President.

In January 2020, David Kabua, son of founding president Amata Kabua, was elected as the new President of the Marshall Islands. His predecessor Hilda Heine lost the position after a vote.

The Presidential cabinet includes offices of Minister-in-Assistance to the President, Minister of Justice, Minister of Finance and Minister of Foreign Affairs

|President
|David Kabua
|Aelon̄ Kein AdUnited Democratic Party
|14 January 2020
|}
The current Presidential Cabinet is as follows:

Legislative branch

The legislative branch of the government of the Marshall Islands consists of the Legislature (Nitijela) with an advisory council of high chiefs. Legislative power lies with the Nitijela. The upper house of Parliament called the Council of Iroij, is an advisory body composed of 12 tribal chiefs.  The Nitijela has 33 members, elected for a four-year term in 19 single-seat and five multi-seat constituencies. Members are called Senators.
The Legislature was last elected 17 November 2011 without the participation of parties, though part of the members could be members of the AKA and United Democratic Party.

The 24 electoral districts into which the country is divided correspond to the inhabited islands and atolls. There are currently four political parties in the Marshall Islands: Aelon Kein Ad (AKA), Kien Eo Am (KEA), United People's Party (UPP), and United Democratic Party (UDP). As of 2011 legislative elections, rule is shared by the AKA and the KEA. The following senators are currently in the legislative body:

Municipalities
The Marshall Islands is divided into 33 municipalities:

Foreign affairs and defense

The Compact of Free Association with the United States gives the U.S. sole responsibility for international defense of the Marshall Islands.  It allows islanders to live and work in the United States, and establishes economic and technical aid programs.

Judicial branch
The Republic of the Marshall Islands has four court systems: Supreme Court, High Court, district and community courts, and the traditional rights court. Trial is by judge or jury. Jurisdiction of the traditional rights court is limited to cases involving titles, land rights, or other disputes arising from customary law and traditional practice.

See also
Elections in the Marshall Islands
List of presidents of the Marshall Islands
Marshall Islands and the United Nations

Notes